Frank W. Ockenfels III (referred to professionally as Frank Ockenfels 3) is an American photographer, artist, and director who is best known for his portraits of prominent celebrities like David Bowie, Angelina Jolie, Kurt Cobain and numerous others. He has also done promotional photography for films and television shows like Breaking Bad, House of Cards, Harry Potter and Pirates of the Caribbean among many others.

Early life and education
Ockenfels was born in West Chester, Pennsylvania|Wynnwood], Pennsylvania but grew up in Lockport, New York, a suburb of Niagara Falls. His interest in photography was spurred as a child, and he often photographed classmates in junior high and high school. He was the yearbook photographer during his senior year of high school. After high school in 1978, Ockenfels applied to and studied at the School of Visual Arts in New York City.

Career
After college, Ockenfels worked as an assistant for Joshua Greene, Milton Greene's son. He cites Greene and Jeff Dunas as his early inspirations and mentors. For a short time, he was an assistant for Saturday Night Lives photographer, Edie Baskin. Ockenfels' career was launched in earnest in 1988 when he was hired to take a portrait of Tracy Chapman for Rolling Stone. The photograph was initially meant to be a quarter-page in support of Chapman's debut album, but it ended up being a double page spread after Chapman began to rise in popularity. This increased Ockenfels' profile as a photographer. Shortly after the Rolling Stone shoot, Frank met Carol LeFlufy who is still representing him today. In 1989, Ockenfels performed his first photo shoots of David Bowie, and he has since taken at least 15 more.

For some period of time in the early 1990s, Ockenfels worked as a director. Over the course of several years, he directed around 20 music videos and 40 commercials. The October 1993 issue of Spin featured a photograph of the band, Nirvana taken by Ockenfels. After lead singer Kurt Cobain's death six months later, the magazine used a cropped image of Cobain from the Ockenfels Nirvana shoot as the cover. Ockenfels went on to photograph numerous musical artists and bands including Jay Z, Alicia Keys, Snoop Dogg, Tom Waits, the Yeah Yeah Yeahs, Soundgarden and others.

In 1993, Ockenfels began working on key art and gallery for television and film. His first job was with the ABC miniseries, Murder in the Heartland. More recently, Ockenfels has shot promotional stills for shows and films like Breaking Bad, Mad Men, House of Cards, Pirates of the Caribbean, The Walking Dead, Men in Black 3, American Horror Story and numerous others. He has also shot portraits of prominent film actors, directors, and other persons of interest. These include Angelina Jolie, George Miller, David Lynch, Tom Hanks, George Clooney, and others. During the 2008 United States presidential election campaign, Ockenfels snapped portraits of future president, Barack Obama.

One of Ockenfels' first solo gallery exhibitions was at the Clark-Oshin Gallery at The Icon in Los Angeles in 2009. An exhibition of Ockenfels' work also appeared at the Kahmann Gallery in Amsterdam in 2014. A more recent solo exhibition appeared at the Black Eye Gallery near Sydney in October 2015. His work has also been a part of several group shows including the traveling David Bowie is exhibition which has appeared in museums in London, Chicago, Paris, and, most recently, Melbourne. In 2012, Ockenfels was honored with the Honorary Key Art Award in October 2012.

Style
Ockenfels has often been noted for his use of non-photographic elements in his work. He applies techniques like collage, painting, and drawing on top of the photographs. An example of this technique is his portrait of Angelina Jolie in which the blue-hued photo of the actress has a red "X" painted on her lips. Ockenfels prefers to incorporate natural light and authentic aesthetics (rather than heavily choreographed designs) into his photographs. He typically does not know anything about the subject prior to shooting.

Earlier in his career, Ockenfels often used minimal equipment for his shoots (typically one light and a mid-range Hasselblad camera). Now, he uses a wide array of different cameras and equipment. Early in his career, he would purchase used film cameras from flea markets and use them for jobs. Ockenfels exclusively uses medium format cameras, stating that high-range digital cameras often produce images that are too sharp. He has also been known to modify cameras with wires, circuit boards, and a wide array of lenses. Ockenfels is also a proponent of Instagram and often takes photos using his mobile phone.

Book/gallery 
From December 5th 2019 - January 11th 2020 Ockenfels' work was displayed at the Fahey/Klein Gallery. The exhibition was a celebration of Frank Ockenfels 3’s long career and an analysis into his personal collaged journals, featured in his first publication Frank Ockenfels 3, Volume 3.  

Frank Ockenfels Volume 3 puts together his creative work into a collection of images that provide a window into his visual thinking, the internal world of imagery and emotions in his mind. Subjected to ink, collage, or paint, the images are no longer just photographs of an individual, but become a more personal statement of who the artist is, of his psyche and as such, creative artistry in its purest form. He creates waking dreams, images that represent the darkest, least-illuminated aspects of his unconscious projected on the person he has photographed. He has the courage to go way beyond the expected and the obvious to the breaking of boundaries of traditional photography. 

The hardcover book is available now.

References

External links
Official website

1960 births
Living people
People from Chester County, Pennsylvania
School of Visual Arts alumni
American photographers